Parksville is a town in McCormick County, South Carolina, United States. The population was 117 at the 2010 census.

Geography
Parksville is located at  (33.785838, -82.218906).

According to the United States Census Bureau, the town has a total area of 0.7 square mile (1.7 km), all land.

Demographics

As of 2010, the population was 117, 110 (94.02%) of which were White, 4 (3.42%) were two or more races, 3 (2.56%) were Black of African American. 1 (0.85%) were Hispanic or Latino (of any race)
At the 2000 census there were 120 people, 51 households, and 37 families living in the town. The population density was 182.6 people per square mile (70.2/km). There were 74 housing units at an average density of 112.6 per square mile (43.3/km).  The racial makeup of the town was 88.33% White, 9.17% African American, 0.83% Pacific Islander, 1.67% from other races.
Of the 51 households 25.5% had children under the age of 18 living with them, 68.6% were married couples living together, 5.9% had a female householder with no husband present, and 25.5% were non-families. 17.6% of households were one person and 13.7% were one person aged 65 or older. The average household size was 2.35 and the average family size was 2.66.

The age distribution was 17.5% under the age of 18, 5.0% from 18 to 24, 27.5% from 25 to 44, 25.0% from 45 to 64, and 25.0% 65 or older. The median age was 45 years. For every 100 females, there were 87.5 males. For every 100 females age 18 and over, there were 76.8 males.

The median household income was $38,958 and the median family income  was $39,583. Males had a median income of $42,188 versus $25,750 for females. The per capita income for the town was $20,607. There were no families and 2.5% of the population living below the poverty line, including no under eighteens and none of those over 64.

References

External Links
 The McCormick County Chamber of Commerce has an article on Parksville

Towns in McCormick County, South Carolina
Towns in South Carolina